Moon's Hill Quarry is a 3.42 hectare geological Site of Special Scientific Interest at Stoke St Michael in Somerset, notified in 1996  and is a Geological Conservation Review site.

The quarry produces Basalt Aggregate known as hardstone and is used for the surface course, the top layer of the road surface.

See also
 Quarries of the Mendip Hills

References

External links
 Geodiversity information from Somerset County Council
 Minerals data from Mindat.org

Sites of Special Scientific Interest in Somerset
Sites of Special Scientific Interest notified in 1996
Quarries in the Mendip Hills
Geology of Somerset